Dioryctria fanjingshana is a species of snout moth in the genus Dioryctria. It was described by H. Li in 2009. It is found in China.

The wingspan is 22–26 mm. The forewings are reddish brown, suffused with dark brown and greyish white. The hindwings are greyish brown.

Etymology
The name is derived from the type locality, Mount Fanjing, Guizhou, China.

References

Moths described in 2009
fanjingshana